Babacar Dione my refer to:

 Babacar Dione (footballer) (born 1997), Belgian footballer
 Babacar Dione (judoka) (born 1961), Senegalese judoka